Headingley Rugby Stadium shares the same site as Headingley Cricket Ground and is home to Leeds Rhinos. Headingley is the 5th largest rugby league stadium in England.

History

1889-1980s: Construction and development
Leeds St Johns, who were later to become Leeds Rugby League Football Club then Leeds Rhinos, moved to Headingley in 1889 and built Headingley stadium. Leeds were founder members of the Northern Union in 1895 and Headingley hosted rugby league's first ever Challenge Cup Final in 1897.

In the 1930s, major developments took place on two sides of the rugby ground. The South Stand was completed in 1931, with some of the work being carried out by club players, while the old wooden North Stand was burned down during a match against Halifax on 25 March 1932. By the end of 1932, a new North Stand had been completed. The record attendance at Headingley was 40,175 for the rugby league match between Leeds and Bradford Northern on 21 May 1947. Undersoil heating was installed in 1963 but has since been removed due to ongoing problems, and floodlights were installed in 1966. The 1970 Rugby League World Cup Final between Great Britain and Australia was played at the stadium before a crowd of 18,776.

The third and deciding Test of the 1978 Ashes series was played at Headingley before a crowd of 30,604.

1990s–2000: Rugby union and World Cup games
New changing rooms were added in 1991, the same year Leeds RFC were founded and moved into Headingley. In July 1998, Leeds RFC became part of the world's first dual-code rugby partnership, Leeds Rugby Limited.

Headingley only hosted one match of the 1995 Rugby League World Cup, held in England and Wales to celebrate the centenary of rugby league in England. Host nation England defeated rugby league minnows South Africa 46–0 in front of 14,041 fans.

Two matches of the 2000 Rugby League World Cup were held at Headingley which included England v. Fiji which England won by 66–10 in front of a crowd of 10,052 and latterly the quarter final fixture between England and Ireland which England won by 26–16 and attracted 15,405 spectators.

2001–2006: East Stand expansion and redevelopment
In 2001 capacity was increased marginally by extending the terracing around the corner in between the Western Terraces and the North Stand.

Since 2005 Headingley rugby stadium has been the venue for the annual varsity rugby union match between Leeds Beckett University and the University of Leeds which has attracted over 11,000 spectators.

2005 also saw the construction of the Carnegie Stand, built to replace the Eastern Terrace. The new stand had two tiers with 1,844 seats and hospitality suites. It was opened on 1 September 2006 for the Super League match between Leeds Rhinos and Warrington Wolves.

2012–2015: More international games

The 2012 World Club Challenge saw the first time that the stadium was fully packed to its capacity when the home team, and Super League XVI Champions, Leeds Rhinos took on the 2011 NRL winners the Manly-Warringah Sea Eagles. 21,062 turned out to see the Rhinos defeat Manly 26–12, the game being highlighted by Ryan Hall's 90 metre intercept try midway through the first half. This saw Leeds gain some revenge for their 28–20 loss to Manly in the 2009 World Club Challenge at Elland Road.

The stadium hosted two matches of the 2013 Rugby League World Cup: a Group B game featuring New Zealand, the defending World Cup Champions, and Papua New Guinea on Friday 8 November which the Kiwis won 56–10 in front of an audience of 18,180. Headingley also hosted a Quarter-final game on Friday 15 November between New Zealand and Scotland which New Zealand won by 40–4 to a crowd of 16,207.

In 2015 Headingley hosted New Zealand again for the first time since 2013 where they took on Leeds Rhinos as a warm up for their test series against England. It also marked 120 years of rugby league being played at the stadium.

2016–2019: Major redevelopment
In 2015 it was announced that the North and South stands were to be rebuilt as part of the overdue redevelopment of the stadium. Parts of the South Stand were condemned in 2011 and the club wanted to modernise the rest of the ground after the new West Stand was completed in 2006.

The South Stand was demolished at the back end of the 2017 season with the North Stand following at the end of the season.

The new South Stand was officially opened on Boxing Day 2018. The standing capacity remains the same as the previous stand with additional seats due to the new North Stand being smaller. The new North Stand opened in May 2019

2020–present
Due to the Covid-19 Pandemic and lockdowns Headingley was chosen as one of the Super League venues to host multiple rounds behind closed doors. 

The stadium also hosted the 2022 Championship Summer Bash.

Future
The rebuilding of the North and South Stands in 2018 future proofed the stadium. The only part of the ground that remains untouched is the Western Terrace. The club have explored possibilities of expanding the stand and putting a roof over it however due the there being a public right of way and residential houses plans have never been able to come to fruition.

Layout

North Stand
Capacity- 3,825 (seated)
The North Stand backs onto the cricket stadium. The stand also houses the changing rooms as well as the media and journalists and a banqueting suite that is shared by both the cricket and rugby grounds.

Global East Stand

Capacity- 4,550 (1,844 seated)
The Global East Stand was completed in 2006 and replaced the Eastern Terrace. The stand has two tiers; the bottom contained terracing whilst the top contains seating, hospitality boxes, bars and a restaurant. It was originally known as the Carnegie Stand but was renamed Extentia Stand in late 2018.

South Stand

Capacity- 7,721 (2,217 seated)
The South Stand is well known in rugby league for being the ground's popular side. The original stand was open to the elements but, following rebuilding in the 1930s, it was partially enclosed by a pitched roof. The roof was extended to cover the entire stand in the 1960s. 

The stand was rebuilt in 2018 and contains two tiers, the bottom tier is terracing and the upper tier is seating. The stand also contains the TV gantry.

Before the replacement of the original roofs in 1999, the front of the South Stand featured a narrow spiral staircase, in full view of all spectators, via which television commentators accessed the television gantry on the roof. Rugby League commentator Eddie Waring claimed that, to brave the taunts and insults from fans as he climbed the stairs, he would sing the hymn, "Fight the Good Fight" to himself until reaching the sanctuary of the commentary box.

Western Terrace

Capacity- 3,604
The Western Terrace is the only part of the stadium not covered and houses the away fans. It is the only part of the ground that has had no major redevelopment nor are there any plans to do so as there is a public right of way and housing behind it. The biggest change to the Western Terrace is the permanent video board in the South West corner which replaced the temporary one in the North West corner.

Sponsors
Headingley first sold naming rights in 1990 to brewers Bass following which the stadium's official name became Bass Headingley. Following the end of this arrangement the ground did not have another naming rights sponsor until 2006 when Leeds Metropolitan University took the rights during the construction of the Carnegie Stand.

In 2017, Headingley sold the naming rights to Bingley-based publishers Emerald Group during the redevelopment of the North and South stands. Emerald withdrew their sponsorship from the full Headingley complex in November 2021, after which the rugby stadium reverted to its original name of Headingley Stadium.

Other uses

Rugby League Internationals

World Cup matches
Headingley has hosted 12 World Cup games since England first hosted the tournament in 1960. The stadium will host three more games during the postponed 2021 World Cup.

Women's World Cup matches

Test matches
List of rugby league test matches played at Headingley.

Tour Matches
Other than Leeds club games, Headingley has also seen Leeds, the county team Yorkshire and a Northern Union XIII (sometimes called English League) side play host to various international touring teams from 1911–2015.

World Club Challenge
Headingley has hosted five games of the World Club Challenge / Championship / Series between 1997–2016.

Rugby League Finals

First Division finals
The ground has hosted six of the old First Division Finals. The first being in 1914 when Salford beat Huddersfield and the last in 1968 when Wakefield beat Hull KR.

Since Super League inception in 1996, Old Trafford has hosted all but one Grand Final.

Second Division finals
Headingley hosted its first Championship Grand Final in 2007 when Castleford beat Widnes in front of 20,000 people to be promoted to Super League. The event returned in 2014 when Leigh beat Featherstone however they were not promoted due to Super League then licensing period.

In 2022, the Million Pound Game will be played at Headingley after it previously being played at the home of the highest seeded team.

Third Division finals
As part of the Championship Finals that included the Championship Grand Final, Headingley hosted the Championship 1 Grand Finals

Challenge Cup Semi Finals
Headingley has hosted 13 Challenge Cup semi finals and one replay since 1981. The last semi final to be held at Headingley was in 2015 when Hull KR beat Warrington. In recent years the semi finals have been held at one neutral venue as a double header.

References

Rugby league stadiums in England
Rugby League World Cup stadiums
Rugby union stadiums in England
Sports venues in Leeds
Leeds Tykes
Leeds Rhinos
Rugby
Sports venues completed in 1890